Samuel ben Ali (also Samuel ben Ali ibn al-Dastur; died 1194) was the most noteworthy of the twelfth-century Babylonian scholars and the only one of his era whose written works have survived in any significant number.

Biography 
Samuel served as head of the academy in Baghdad for nearly thirty years and was a recognized leader of neighboring countries as well. He appointed judges throughout Iraq, Iran, and Syria, and presided over many congregations throughout Asia. His Talmudic lectures were attended by thousands of pupils, each who had undergone a preparatory course in advance. He was also well-versed in the field of astrology.

Samuel had a strong personality and clashed with Maimonides on a variety of occasions. Samuel wrote glosses to Maimonides’ works, and the latter addressed them in a letter to his student, Joseph b. Judah. Samuel criticized Maimonides’ position on resurrection and the world to come and had fiercely debated Maimonides’ student, Joseph b. Judah, on these issues as well. Additionally, circles associated with Samuel were disseminating propaganda attacking Maimonides’ positions.

Samuel’s daughter had become reputable, under the name of Bat ha-Levi, for her Talmudic expertise and public lectures to students who would remain outside and listen, while she remained indoors and unseen.

A collection of Samuel’s letters were published in Tarbiẕ.

References

Exilarchs
12th-century Abbasid rabbis
1194 deaths
Year of birth unknown
Rabbis from Baghdad